Kamen Rider Zero-One is a Japanese tokusatsu drama in Toei Company's Kamen Rider franchise. It is the first series in the Reiwa period run and the thirtieth series overall.

Each episode title has a Japanese pronoun written in katakana.

Episodes

References

Zero-One
Episodes